La Merced District is one of five districts in the Aija Province of the Ancash Region in Peru. It is located between 77°43 ´ 57 " S and 77°35 ´ 51 " W with an average altitude of 3,272 m.s.n.m. Its population was 1582 as of the 2017 census.

See also 
 Puka Hirka
 Puma Wayin

References

Districts of the Aija Province
Districts of the Ancash Region